The Manitowoc River is a  river in eastern Wisconsin in the United States. It flows into Lake Michigan at the city of Manitowoc.

Course
The Manitowoc River is formed in eastern Calumet County by its north and south branches:
The North Branch Manitowoc River rises in northern Calumet County and flows  generally southeastwardly.

From the confluence of its forks, the Manitowoc flows generally eastwardly through central Manitowoc County to its mouth at Lake Michigan in the city of Manitowoc. Its largest tributary is the Branch River.

Little Manitowoc River
The Little Manitowoc River is a  stream that flows into Lake Michigan about 1 mi (2 km) north of the mouth of the Manitowoc River.

See also
List of rivers of Wisconsin

References

Sources
Columbia Gazetteer of North America entry
DeLorme (1992).  Wisconsin Atlas & Gazetteer.  Freeport, Maine: DeLorme.  .

Rivers of Wisconsin
Rivers of Calumet County, Wisconsin
Rivers of Fond du Lac County, Wisconsin
Rivers of Manitowoc County, Wisconsin
Tributaries of Lake Michigan